"Stand Up" is the debut single released by Australian rock group, The Triffids in July 1981. The production by Peter Simpson for the Shake Some Action label was the prize for the band winning a song competition in late 1980. The competition was sponsored by the Western Australian Institute of Technology (now Curtin University) Student Guild’s radio show on 6NR (now Curtin FM).

The lyrics of the chorus exemplify a tone that singer-songwriter, David McComb, would pursue throughout his work.

"...Stand up for your rightsGrab your baby and hold her tightIf she don't love you well it's OKWe're all gonna die anyway..."

McComb later said, "Most people preferred 'Farmers'. I guess people find that sort of thing zany. To this day we get people screaming out for that song when we play live."

Track listing
All tracks written by David McComb.

 "Stand Up" - 1:41
 "Farmers Never Visit Nightclubs" - 2:34

Personnel
 Robert McComb - guitar, vocals
 David McComb - lead vocals, guitar
 Will Akers - bass, vocals
 Mark Peters - drums
 Margaret Gillard - piano, organ, vocals

References

1981 singles
The Triffids songs
1981 songs
Songs written by David McComb